The South Africa cricket team toured Ireland in July 2021 to play three One Day International (ODI) and three Twenty20 International (T20I) matches. The ODI series formed part of the inaugural 2020–2023 ICC Cricket World Cup Super League. Cricket Ireland confirmed the fixtures in February 2021. Originally, the first and the third T20I matches were scheduled take place on 20 and 25 July respectively. However, in June 2021, Cricket Ireland made a minor change to the tour itinerary by moving both of those matches forward by one day. It was South Africa's first full limited overs tour of Ireland, after previously playing one ODI in Belfast in June 2007. The opening T20I fixture was the first time the two teams had played each other in that format.

Only 40.2 overs of Ireland's innings in the first ODI were possible due to rain, with the match finishing as a no result. Ireland won the second ODI by 43 runs to record their first ever win against South Africa in international cricket. South Africa won the third ODI by 70 runs to draw the series 1–1. South Africa won the first two T20I matches to win the series with a match to spare. South Africa won the third T20I by 49 runs to win the series 3–0.

Squads

Prior to the tour, Sisanda Magala was ruled out of South Africa's squad due to an ankle injury with Beuran Hendricks named as his replacement. Wiaan Mulder was also added to South Africa's T20I squad. Ahead of the first ODI, Jeremy Lawlor was added to Ireland's squad. Neil Rock was ruled out of Ireland's T20I after testing positive for COVID-19, with Stephen Doheny named as his replacement.

ODI series

1st ODI

2nd ODI

3rd ODI

T20I series

1st T20I

2nd T20I

3rd T20I

References

External links
 Series home at ESPN Cricinfo

2021 in Irish cricket
2021 in South African cricket
International cricket competitions in 2021
South African cricket tours of Ireland